Divine Invincible Great General Cannon also known as, "Weiyuan General Cannon" was a type of long-barreled heavy artillery in the Qing Dynasty,  built by Nan Huairen,  a Flemish Jesuit missionary in China, in the 15th year of Kangxi (1676). 

Divine Invincible Great General Cannon was named by Emperor Kangxi himself. The Divine Invincible Great General Cannon was made of bronze, there were 52 cannons in total.

Specifications
Divine Invincible Great General Cannon weighs from 2,000 catty to 3,000 catty, and is from 7 Chinese feet 3 Chinese inches to 8 Chinese feet long.

Usage

In 1685, the Qing army used eight Divine Invincible Great General Cannons against the invading Russian army, and these cannons played an important role in the Battle of Yaksa (雅克萨战役). The Qing Empire won the battle and signed the Treaty of Nerchinsk  with the Tsardom of Russia.

Discovery
In May 1975, the workers of Qiqihar Jianhua Machinery Factory (齐齐哈尔建华机械厂) found a Divine Invincible Great General Cannon used by the Qing army in the Battle of Yaksa.

References

Cannon
17th century in China
Chinese inventions
Artillery of China
17th-century weapons
Military history of the Qing dynasty